Marguerite Hardiman is an English television actress who has appeared in Crossroads; Softly, Softly, Play For Today, Robin's Nest and Sorry! as Muriel. She also appeared in the British horror film Disciple of Death (1972) starring Mike Raven.

External links

1950 births
Living people